Marty is a British television sketch comedy series, with Marty Feldman, Tim Brooke-Taylor, John Junkin, Roland MacLeod, Mary Miller and Peter Pocock which was made in 1968. There was a second series made in 1969, re-titled It's Marty. In total, 12 episodes were produced.

The writers were John Cleese, Tim Brooke-Taylor, John Junkin, Marty Feldman, Barry Took, Graham Chapman, Terry Jones, Philip Jenkinson, Donald Webster, Peter Dickinson, Terry Gilliam, Michael Palin, John Law, Frank Muir and Denis Norden. Lionel Blair choreographed a routine for an episode of It's Marty. Took and Marty Feldman were given an award for the show by the actor Kenneth Horne.

A compilation of surviving sketches from the series has been released on DVD, with the title The Best of Marty Feldman.

List of episodes 
The following episodes, compilations and specials were produced for the BBC between 1968 and 1971.

Series 1

Series 2

Specials

Awards
 1969 BAFTA Television Awards
 Best Light Entertainment Performer - won by Marty Feldman
 Best Light Entertainment Production - won by Dennis Main-Wilson
 Best Writer - won by Marty Feldman and Barry Took

 1969 Writer's Guild of Great Britain Award
 Best British Light Entertainment Script - won by the series writers of Marty and It's Marty

References

External links
 

1960s British television sketch shows
1968 British television series debuts
Lost BBC episodes
BBC television comedy
BBC television sketch shows